Skate, also known as Skate Maloley and Sk8 (born Nathan Montgomery Maloley on January 17, 1995), is an American rapper, songwriter, and music producer from Omaha, Nebraska.

Early life
Skate was born in Omaha, Nebraska. He is of Lebanese-American heritage. He has two siblings, Kaylan and Stewart. Growing up, Skate had a passion for sports and music. He played for the basketball team at Papillion-La Vista Senior High School in Papillion, Nebraska. Skate attributes his interest in hip hop to a Wiz Khalifa concert he attended as a freshman in high school.

After graduating from high school, Skate went on to play basketball at Hastings College. Shortly after, Skate left the sports arena and moved to Los Angeles, California in 2015 to focus on music.

Career

Music
Skate premiered his debut single Little Bit in the 2015 film, The Chosen featuring YouTube star Kian Lawley and actress Elizabeth Keener. Amidst other single releases, Skate has released four full-length album mixtapes: Twenty-Fifteen, Maloski, Skaterade, and Late 2 The Party.

Skate's earliest songs were collaborations with childhood friend Sammy Wilk (born Samuel Wilkinson) under the monikers Young Skate & Sammy and also Sammy & Skate. The two released several tracks together, including a collaboration with DJ Rupp titled Where Art Thou, which, to date, has accumulated more than a million plays on YouTube.

Touring
In early 2016, Skate embarked upon his first-ever headlining tour to promote his mixtape Skaterade. The tour traveled across 15 US cities, beginning in San Francisco, and ending in a sold-out show at the Roxy Theatre in Hollywood, California.

As of 2016, Skate has performed on stage with the likes of Rae Sremmurd, Jack & Jack, Derek Luh, Sammy Wilk, and others.

Webster Hall Incident
During a show date at New York City's Webster Hall for the Skaterade Tour, Skate got into an altercation with Gerard McNamee from the venue's security team, which turned into a brawl between the guards and Skate's tour companions. As well as the audience. Due to the gravity of the situation, the show in Boston the following night was canceled. The incident received press coverage from publications including Complex, SPIN, Billboard, and others.

Skate then released a track via SoundCloud a few days after eponymously titled Webster Hall.

References

External links
 Official website

1995 births
American rappers
Living people
American people of Scottish descent
American people of Lebanese descent
21st-century American rappers